Mohammed Jaber (Arabic:محمد جابر) (born 28 January 1989) is an Emirati footballer. He currently plays for Al Wasl.

External links

References

Emirati footballers
1989 births
Living people
Baniyas Club players
Al Ahli Club (Dubai) players
Shabab Al-Ahli Club players
Sharjah FC players
Al-Wasl F.C. players
UAE Pro League players
Association football defenders